The Goal of the Season award is handed out annually to the best goal scored in the League of Ireland in that particular year. Previously awarded by the eircom League Weekly team on TV3, since the league's highlights show has been shown on Monday Night Soccer, the award is now given by members of RTÉ Sport. The first winner of the award from RTÉ was Keith Fahey for his 35-yard strike against Bohemians at Dalymount Park during the 2008 League of Ireland season.

List of winners

External links
 Fahey wins Goal of the Season

League of Ireland trophies and awards
Republic of Ireland association football trophies and awards
Association football goal of the year awards